The , also known as the , was a rebellion against the Tokugawa shogunate in Japan that took place on August 20 [lunar calendar: 19th day, 7th month], 1864, near the Imperial Palace in Kyoto.

History
Starting with the Convention of Kanagawa in 1854, within a few years foreign powers forced the shogun dynasty to abandon its isolationist policy sakoku. The rebellion reflected the widespread discontent felt among both pro-imperial/anti-shogunate and anti-foreigner groups, who rebelled under the sonnō jōi ("revere the emperor, expel the barbarians") slogan. Emperor Kōmei had issued an "Order to expel barbarians". Thus, in March 1863, the shishi rebels sought to take control of the Emperor to restore the Imperial household to its position of political supremacy.

During what was a bloody crushing of the rebellion, the leading Chōshū clan was held responsible for its instigation. To counter the rebels' kidnapping attempt, armies of the Aizu and Satsuma domains (the latter led by Saigo Takamori) led the defense of the Imperial palace. However, during the attempt, the rebels set Kyoto on fire, starting with the residence of the Takatsukasa family, and that of a Chōshū official. It is unknown if the rebels set fire to Kyoto as soon as they began to lose, or if their doing so was part of their original strategy, and done as a diversionary tactic. Among the shishi who died in the incident was Kusaka Genzui.

Various courtiers, including Nakayama Tadayasu, the Emperor's Special Consultant for National Affairs, were banished from Court as a result of their involvement in this incident. Sanjō Sanetomi, due to his association with many of the shishi that were captured, executed or identified during the rebellion, was forced to flee. The shogunate followed the incident with a retaliatory armed expedition, the First Chōshū expedition, in September 1864.

References 

Conflicts in 1864
1864 in Japan
19th-century rebellions
Rebellions in Japan
Bakumatsu
August 1864 events
History of Kyoto